Barbara Adams (born November 17, 1951, Hutchinson, Kansas) was appointed General counsel of Pennsylvania on June 1, 2005 by Governor Edward G. Rendell, a post she held until January 17, 2011.

Adams, who was raised in Pottsville, Pennsylvania, had been a partner with Duane Morris LLP in Philadelphia since 1986, a firm she joined originally as a summer associate in 1977.

She graduated from Temple University School of Law in 1978 and previously from Smith College.

References

External links
Office of General Counsel, Pennsylvania website

Living people
1951 births
People from Hutchinson, Kansas
Politicians from Pottsville, Pennsylvania
Temple University Beasley School of Law alumni
Smith College alumni
Pennsylvania Office of General Counsel